Brian Edward Murphy (born 7 May 1983) is a retired Irish professional footballer who played as a goalkeeper.

Murphy began his career at English side Manchester City. He spent spells out on loan at Oldham Athletic and Peterborough United but did not make a senior appearance at Manchester City before leaving to join Swansea City in 2003. He spent three seasons at Swansea before returning to his native Ireland to join Bohemian where he spent another three years. In November 2009 he returned to England to join Ipswich Town, where he spent two seasons before joining Queens Park Rangers in 2011. Murphy spent four seasons at Queens Park Rangers before leaving to join Portsmouth in 2015, where he spent one season, before joining Cardiff City in 2016, spending a further four seasons with Cardiff before once again returning to Ireland in 2020 to join Waterford.

Club career
Murphy played football and hurling with one of his primary schools, Dunhill Ns Killea BNS in Dunmore East. As a teenager, Murphy did not harbour ambitions to be a professional football player. He was involved in many sports as a child including gaelic football, hurling and rugby union. It was rugby that Murphy wished to pursue as a career, playing as an outside half for his school and club. He was also the kicker for his teams, and once confessed to being able to "boom a ball a long way from about 14 years old". This is now something that he has developed a reputation for as a professional goalkeeper. At 15 years of age, Murphy had rugby trials with Ireland but ultimately decided not to pursue when Manchester City offered him a place in their youth set-up.

Manchester City
Murphy spent four seasons with Manchester City where the competition for the number one jersey included David Seaman, Nicky Weaver and Carlo Nash, but made the 1st team bench on a number of occasions in the old 1st Division (second tier) and the Premier League. Loaned out to Oldham Athletic in 2002–03, he made his senior début during a loan period with Peterborough United that same season away to Brentford in League One in May 2003.

Swansea City
Brian Flynn signed him for Swansea City on a free transfer two months later, and he made 13 appearances for the club during the 2003–04 season. He was kept out of the first team in the following two seasons by the form of Frenchman Willy Gueret.

Bohemian
Murphy was one of the first players signed by Bohemian manager Sean Connor. He made an instant impression in pre-season friendlies, giving him the edge over on-loan Aston Villa goalkeeper Lee Boyle. Murphy kept 19 clean sheets in his 29 league games during the 2007 season to help "Bohs" to the best defensive record in the league.

Murphy ended rumors linking him to Bristol City by signing an improved contract at Bohemians in November 2007.

On 11 January 2008, he was voted "Goalkeeper of the Year" for the 2007 season by the Soccer Writers Association of Ireland.

Murphy was voted (by the supporters) Eircom League of Ireland Premier Division Player of the Season for 2008 receiving 54% of the votes on eircomloi.ie, the league's official website after keeping 20 clean sheets in 33 league games. He added a FAI Cup winners medal to his League winning one when saving two penalties in a penalty shoot-out win over Derry City on 23 November. And the honours kept coming for Murphy as he was announced as the SWAI Player of the Month for November.

On 4 December 2008, he regained the "Goalkeeper of the Year" award as voted by the Soccer Writers Association of Ireland and his performances were further recognised on 8 February 2009 when he became the first goalkeeper to be awarded League of Ireland Player of the Year for the 2008 season.

Murphy continued his outstanding form through the start of the 2009 season and excelled in Bohemians UEFA Champions League qualifying tie against Red Bull Salzburg, saving a penalty from Austrian international Marc Janko at the Red Bull Arena. However Murphy and "Bohs" would depart that competition, losing 2–1 on aggregate.

Back in domestic action on 17 August 2009, Murphy scored and saved twice in a penalty shoot-out against Dundalk in the fourth round of the FAI Cup to help Bohemians through to the next round. He then added to his collection of medals in September as "Bohs" beat Waterford United in the final of the League of Ireland Cup. And he wasn't done yet as a great run of form towards the end of the season helped Murphy and Bohs to their second League of Ireland Premier Division title in a row, winning by 4 points from closest rivals Shamrock Rovers.

The game against Bray Wanderers on 6 November 2009 would be Murphy's 97th and last league appearance for Bohemians before his move to Ipswich Town. In those 97 games, Murphy kept an outstanding 63 clean sheets.

Ipswich Town
In late 2009 Murphy agreed to join Ipswich Town during the January 2010 transfer window. This was announced on the same day that Bohemians won their second successive League of Ireland title, and Murphy received his first call into the Irish senior squad. At the start of the January transfer window, Murphy formalized his transfer to Portman Road.

His first appearance in the Town squad came on 10 January 2010 against Leicester City. Arran Lee-Barrett was to start in goal after showing impressive form late in 2009, with Murphy covering on the bench. However, Murphy was injured in the warm up at Leicester and was subsequently unable to fulfill his place on the bench for Town. The injury was to his knee ligaments and kept Murphy out until February, when he made a reserves appearance in a 1–0 win at Norwich. Lee-Barrett was, by this time, beginning to lose the form he had previously shown – something that was highlighted in a defeat away to table propping Peterborough. The following game Murphy was handed his debut against Sheffield Wednesday and kept a clean sheet on 20 February 2010.

Murphy impressed in that game, especially when he denied the Owls with a close range, reflex save in the first half. He retained his place in goal for the next game with Scunthorpe only conceding one goal. His home debut came against Bristol City on 27 January 2010, making one extremely memorable and spectacular save from David Clarkson. Indeed, it turned out to be a game for the goalkeepers, because for all Ipswich dominated, it was Murphy's opposite number, Dean Gerken who stole the headlines with a spectacular performance that included five world class saves.

On 7 May 2011 it was confirmed that Murphy had rejected a new contract and would be leaving the club.

Queens Park Rangers
After impressing on trial Murphy signed a two-year deal with Queens Park Rangers. He made his first start for the club in a 2–0 loss to Rochdale in the League Cup. Despite only playing once in his first two seasons, Murphy signed a new two-year deal following the club's relegation.

Portsmouth
On 8 August 2015, Murphy signed a deal until January with Portsmouth, making his debut for the club in a 3–0 home win against Dagenham & Redbridge on the same day.

Cardiff City
On 2 September 2016, Murphy joined Football League Championship side Cardiff City. He was released at the end of the 2018–19 season. However, he was re-signed by the club in August 2019 as injury cover.

Waterford
On 12 February 2020, it was announced that Murphy had signed for his hometown club Waterford of the League of Ireland Premier Division. After 3 seasons with the club, Murphy announced his retirement from football in January 2023.

International career
Murphy represented the Republic of Ireland Under-16 team at the 2000 UEFA European Under-16 Football Championship and the Under-19 team at the 2002 UEFA European Under-19 Football Championship. He was a regular in the Ireland under-19 squad under Brian Kerr and was preferred to Aston Villa goalkeeper Wayne Henderson for the European under-19 Championships qualifiers and finals in 2002 until a shoulder injury allowed Henderson to reclaim his place. He has been capped since at under-20 and under-21 levels.

On 6 November 2009, Murphy was called up to the Ireland squad for the World Cup play-offs against France following the withdrawal of Coventry City's Keiren Westwood. He was not called up again until 3 March 2014 for the friendly versus Serbia following the withdrawal of Rob Elliot.

Career statistics

Honours
Swansea
EFL Trophy: 2005–06

Bohemian
League of Ireland: 2008, 2009
FAI Cup: 2008
League of Ireland Cup: 2009

Individual
SWAI Goalkeeper of the Year: 2007, 2008, 2009
League of Ireland Player of the Year: 2008
Bohemian Player of the Year: 2007
PFAI Team of the Year: 2007, 2008, 2009

References

External links

1983 births
Living people
Sportspeople from Waterford (city)
Association footballers from County Waterford
Association football goalkeepers
Republic of Ireland association footballers
Republic of Ireland youth international footballers
Manchester City F.C. players
Oldham Athletic A.F.C. players
Peterborough United F.C. players
Swansea City A.F.C. players
Bohemian F.C. players
Ipswich Town F.C. players
Queens Park Rangers F.C. players
Portsmouth F.C. players
Cardiff City F.C. players
Waterford F.C. players
English Football League players
League of Ireland players
Irish expatriate sportspeople in England
Republic of Ireland expatriate association footballers
Expatriate footballers in England